Nada is the fifth album of composer Peter Michael Hamel, released in 1977 through WERGO.

Track listing

Personnel
Anatol Arkus – synthesizer on "Nada"
Werner Bethsold – photography
Peter Michael Hamel – piano, electronic organ, synthesizer
Ulrich Kraus – production, engineering, synthesizer on "Nada"
Heinz-Jürgen Kropp – design

References

1977 albums
Peter Michael Hamel albums